Karadut (literally "black mulberry" in Turkish) may refer to the following places in Turkey:

 Karadut, Kahta, a village in the district of Kahta, Adıyaman Province
 Karadut, Koçarlı, a village in the district of Koçarlı, Aydın Province
 Karadut, Musabeyli, a village in Musabeyli District, Kilis Province